Ruslan Kamilyevich Ishkinin (born 14 June 1974) is a former Russian professional footballer.

Club career
He made his professional debut in the Russian Second Division in 1992 for FC Dynamo-2 Moscow.

The most memorable match of his career was played on 14 June 1995. His team FC Dynamo Moscow was playing FC Rotor Volgograd in the final game of the Russian Cup. Dynamo was decimated by injuries and several reserve players, including Ishkinin, were called up for the game. With 5 minutes to go in regulation and the score of 0–0, Ishkinin came on as a substitute. The score remained 0–0, in the shootout Ishkinin scored to make the score 2–2. Dynamo went on to win the shootout 8–7 and that Cup victory remains the only trophy Dynamo has won in the last 35 years (as of 2019). Ishkinin only played 2 more games for the main squad of Dynamo.

References

1974 births
Footballers from Moscow
Living people
Russian footballers
Association football midfielders
FC Dynamo Moscow players
Russian Premier League players
FC Saturn Ramenskoye players
FC Znamya Truda Orekhovo-Zuyevo players